Yerevan Lake ( (Yerevanyan lich)) is an artificial reservoir located in the capital of Armenia in Yerevan. It was formed between 1963 and 1966, to be opened in 1967.

1976 bus accident
On September 16, 1976 Shavarsh Karapetyan training with his brother Kamo, also a finswimmer, by running alongside the reservoir, Karapetyan had just completed his usual distance of  when he heard the sound of a crash and saw a sinking Yerevan trolleybus which had gone out of control and fallen from the dam wall.
The trolleybus lay at the bottom of the reservoir some 25 meters (80 ft) off the shore at a depth of 10 meters (33 ft). Karapetyan swam to it and, under conditions of almost zero visibility due to the silt rising from the bottom, broke the back window with his legs. The trolleybus was crowded, it carried 92 passengers and Karapetyan knew he had little time, spending some 30 to 35 seconds for each person he saved. He saved 20 lives.

References

Yerevan Lake To Become Resting Zone In Coming One-Two Years

Lakes of Armenia
Geography of Yerevan